Practice Makes Paper is the twenty-sixth studio album by American rapper E-40 and the second installment from the Definitions trilogy. It was released on July 26, 2019 by Heavy on the Grind.

The album features guest appearances from Anthony Hamilton, ASAP Ferg, Chris Brown, Fabolous, G-Eazy, Quavo, Rick Ross, Roddy Ricch, Scarface, Schoolboy Q, Tee Grizzley, Wiz Khalifa, Method Man, Redman among others.

Background
In August 2018, E-40 announced that he was releasing three albums: The Gift of Gab in August, Rule of Thumb in October and Practice Makes Paper in December. Practice Makes Paper was eventually delayed until July 26th. As of 2022, Rule of Thumb has yet to be released.

Singles
The lead single from the album, "Melt", was released on March 14, 2019 and features a guest appearance from rapper Milla. The song was produced by Clayton William.

The second single, "Chase the Money", was released on June 18, 2019 and features guest appearances from rappers Quavo, Roddy Ricch, Schoolboy Q and ASAP Ferg. The song was produced by ChaseTheMoney. It peaked at number 36 on the Billboard Rhythmic chart.

Track listing

Charts

References

2019 albums
E-40 albums
Albums produced by Hitmaka
Sick Wid It Records albums